"Fragile" is a Mandarin single by Malaysian singer Namewee and Australian singer Kimberley Chen released on 15 October 2021. On YouTube, the song had over 15 million views within days, and it held the top spot of Hong Kong, Taiwan, Malaysia and Singapore's music trends for several weeks. Written as a comedic pop duet and featuring a dancing panda in the music video, "Fragile" satirizes the social issues in China, the political status of Taiwan, the Xinjiang internment camps, censorship in China, as well as the Little Pinks' response.

Response

During Production 
This song's lyrics "It is illegal to breach Firewall, you'll be missed if the Pooh discovers it", it implied that Little Pinks use the VPN (Virtual Private Network) software to access foreign social networking sites blocked by the Great Firewall to abuse others.

China 
Sina Weibo blocked Namewee and Kimberley Chen's accounts, while other Chinese platforms such as Douyin and Baidu Tieba have also hidden the song after its release. State-owned tabloid Global Times described the song as "malicious" and said, with no ironic undertone, that it had "insulted the Chinese people".

Kimberley Chen 
In a social media post attaching an adapted version of "Fragile", Kimberley Chen mentioned that she does not care about being blocked by Weibo because she has accounts on Facebook and Instagram.

Namewee 
As a response to getting banned in China, Namewee states in a post that he does not think that he is banned, as the ones who are truly banned are those who have been denied the right to listen to songs freely.

Scholarly views 
Jeroen de Kloet, a professor of media studies at the University of Amsterdam, said that the song was about censorship and that its censorship in China only amplified its impact. 

Geremie Barmé, a sinologist at the Australian National University, praised the song for its "celebration of joyfulness while also being politically pointed", saying also that it "offers a valuable lesson for the world about China and its increasingly complex cultural reach".

NFT 
On 7 November, non-fungible tokens of "Fragile" were sold for 209 ETH, netting the singers around 27 million NTD within three hours of launch.

Charts

Weekly Charts

Accolades

References

External links

2021 songs
Chinese political satire
Mandopop songs
Satirical songs
Works banned in China
Political songs